Endless Boogie is an American rock band, formed in 1997 in Brooklyn, New York. The current line-up of the band consists of Paul Major (vocals, guitar), Jesper Eklow (guitar), Marc Razo (bass) and Harry Druzd (drums). The band takes its name from John Lee Hooker's 1971 album of the same name.

The band is known for "its minimalist jams both onstage and on record."

History
The band was formed in 1997 by Matador Records employees and a professional record collector for jamming. Initially having no plans to record or to tour, the band played their first live show in 2001 as an opening act for Pavement's Stephen Malkmus. After releasing a pair of rare vinyl LPs from 2005, the band released the albums Focus Level in 2008 and Full House Head in 2010. Touring with bands such as Dungen and Circle, the band released their fourth album, Long Island in 2013.

Musical style
The band's style has been labeled as hard rock, psychedelic rock, stoner rock and blues rock. The band's minimalist musical style also attributes krautrock influences, being described as "classic-rock-meets-krautrock" and " repetitive, one-chord riff-rock." The band described their musical style as "Kraut Southern rock."

The band's style also has been compared to those of ZZ Top, AC/DC, Teenage Head-era Flamin’ Groovies, Canned Heat, Amon Düül, Can, The Groundhogs, The Stooges and the Velvet Underground. Tom Hughes of The Guardian described Major's vocals as being "somewhere between a John Lee Hooker drawl and a Captain Beefheart honk."

Band members
Current members
Paul "Top Dollar" Major – vocals, guitar
Paul Major was born in Louisville, Kentucky, in 1954, and is an author and known record collector.  After stints playing in bands in St. Louis and Los Angeles, he moved to New York in 1978 and spent the next few years embroiled in the city’s explosive punk scene (most notably as part of the proto-speed metal band the Sorcerers). Paul began a mail-order LP business and would become known in the subculture for his record collecting before joining Endless Boogie at its formation in 1997. In 2017 he authored the Coffee table book “Feel the Music: The Psychedelic Worlds of Paul Major“.

Jesper "The Governor" Eklow – guitar
Marc Razo – bass
Harry Druzd – drums

Former members
Chris Gray – drums

Discography
Studio albums
 Focus Level (2008)
 Full House Head (2010)
 Twenty Minute Jam Getting Out Of The City (2011)
 Long Island (2013)
 Vibe Killer (2017)
 Admonitions (2021)

EPs and singles
 "Swedish Pizza" (2012)
 Matinicus EP (2013)
 Split Single (2020)

Compilations
 The Skinless Ogress Revolution, Which Feeds On Human Sacrifice (2011)

Other releases
 Volume 1 (2005)
 Volume 2 (2005)

References

External links
 Endless Boogie on Facebook
 Feel the Music: The Psychedelic Worlds of Paul Major on Amazon

American blues rock musical groups
American experimental rock groups
Hard rock musical groups from New York (state)
Musical groups established in 1997
Musical groups from Brooklyn
Musical quartets
Psychedelic rock music groups from New York (state)
American stoner rock musical groups